Tisbury railway station serves the village of Tisbury in Wiltshire, England.

History

At first only passengers were catered for, but goods traffic started on 1 September 1860. The main goods yard and warehouse was on the north side of the line at the west end of the station, but some sidings were also added on the opposite side of the line. Initially the railway had just a single track but a passing loop and two platforms were provided at Tisbury. The whole line was double track by 1870 and a signal box was opened here in 1875.

The S&YR never operated any trains, instead they were provided by the London and South Western Railway, which bought out the S&YR in 1878. In 1923 this became part of the Southern Railway, which in turn was nationalised in 1948 to become the Southern Region of British Railways. During all this time there were only incremental changes at Tisbury, but this was to change from 1963. In that year the line was transferred to the Western Region, and the Reshaping of British Railways report was published. Goods traffic was stopped from 18 April 1966 and on 5 February 1967 the signal box was closed, despite having only been opened to replace the original on 12 October 1958. The line was reduced to just a single track on 1 April 1967 and the southern platform sold off to the agricultural suppliers next door. The old station offices still stand, as does the disused signal box which is at the west end of the platform.

The  single-track section from Wilton to Gillingham proved to be too long, and so a loop was reinstated mid-way at Tisbury on 24 March 1986. As the second platform had been sold off, the new £435,000 loop was installed to the east of the station. This means that trains have to wait outside the station when passing; the loop is controlled from Basingstoke ASC and is signalled so that trains can run in either direction on each line.

Services
Trains are timetabled to pass in the loop to the east of the station. Due to the short platform, passengers wishing to alight need to be in the front 3 coaches of the train as the platform can only take 3-car trains.

See also
 Southern Railway routes west of Salisbury

References

 Body, G. (1984), PSL Field Guides - Railways of the Southern Region, Patrick Stephens Ltd, Cambridge, 

Railway stations in Wiltshire
DfT Category E stations
Former London and South Western Railway stations
Railway stations in Great Britain opened in 1859
Railway stations served by South Western Railway